The Sultan Abdul Halim ferry terminal bridge collapse was a disaster of the Penang Ferry Service which occurred on 31 July 1988, at the Sultan Abdul Halim Ferry Terminal in Butterworth, Penang, Malaysia. The collapse caused the deaths of 32 people and injured 1,634 people. It was blamed on overcrowding and the jetty being made out of steel bars that led to the collapse.

Transport Minister Ling Liong Sik pledged a full and open inquiry to determine its causes, with Chief Minister Lim Chong Eu promising to help the victims through a welfare fund.

Cause

Two simultaneous festivities
The cause was extreme crowding at the Sultan Abdul Halim Ferry Terminal of about 10,000 people. There were two simultaneous festivities involving the Chinese ethnic group, namely the Kwan Yin Goddess festival in George Town and the St. Anne's Church anniversary in Bukit Mertajam, Penang. The decorated float procession was held at the Esplanade and at Padang Kota [field between Dato Keramat Road and Anson Road] as well as passing through main streets of Georgetown. Statues of this goddess were paraded along streets decorated with colourful lights in the middle of the city on Sunday 31 July 1988 night. There was a call for Buddhist devotees from the Chinese ethnic group to attend the event because it was held only once every 60 years according to the Chinese calendar (a once-in-a-lifetime occasion) and this festivity was believed to bring prosperity because Kwan Yin means 'Goddess of Generosity'. Tourists from Singapore, Hong Kong and Taiwan also came at that time.

St. Anne's Church in Bukit Mertajam was also holding a large festival for its anniversary. Many Christian ethnic Chinese worshipped at this church on Sunday morning and proceeded to Penang in the afternoon to visit and observe the Buddhist ceremony.

Packed bridge
The Penang Bridge which opened in 1985 did not accommodate public transport. Many people chose to go to the island to enjoy the scenic Butterworth Strait and sunset, and continue to the Esplanade on foot.

Packed jetty
The Sultan Abdul Halim Ferry Terminal had two levels. The lower level was for cars and other small vehicles to roll-on/roll-off. The upper level was for passengers from and to the Butterworth bus station. The terminal, built in 1956 could not withstand the 'assault' of 10,000 passengers. Its columns were made of reinforced concrete and floor of thick boards. The floor beams, fencing and walls, made of dense steel, covered the passageway for vehicles beneath.  At 4:40 p.m., the beams buckled and snapped. The floor boards consequently collapsed. The steel walls and roof caved in. The passengers above slid and were crushed by columns and platform boards. Vehicles beneath were smashed.

Victims
32 people were killed and 1,674 people were injured. Victims were taken to Butterworth Hospital, Bukit Mertajam Hospital and other hospitals. The fire brigade struggled to extricate victims. The left passage was completely stopped. But the right passage could still operate, letting passengers travel to the island and back. The wreckage was left for a while for investigation and expansion planning.

This news of the ferry terminal collapse was reported on the 8:00 p.m. TV3 main news.

Effects

After the incident, the Penang Port Authority studied the suitability and efficiency of the use of ferries between Butterworth and Raja Tun Uda Ferry Terminal at the Penang side. Express bus passengers were dropped not only at the Butterwoth bus station but also at Sungai Dua and Gelugor. Given the relative speeds of crossing the strait by ferry versus the Penang Bridge, most regular commuters now prefer the bridge.

The Sultan Abdul Halim Ferry Terminal was rebuilt with several modifications.

In popular culture
On 11 April 2015, TV3 (Malaysia)'s documentary programme - "Detik Tragik" (Tragic Moments) produced an episode about the ferry terminal bridge collapse. This is followed by Fail Bomba of Radio Televisyen Malaysia (RTM) in 2017.

References

Further reading
 Rozlan Ishak, Alias Aziz, Norlen Mohamed (2004). DISASTER MANAGEMENT PLAN FOR THE STATE OF PENANG (PDF file). Retrieved 17 February 2005. (Note: the link to document is not available now.)
 The only one picture is available on Malaysia Fire and Rescue Volunteers's website. 
 Special report from Kwang Wah Jit Poh that included some pictures. (with Google translator) 
 Tragic Disasters in Malaysia by Fire and Rescue Volunteers, Malaysia

1988 disasters in Asia
Transport disasters in Malaysia
July 1988 events in Asia
1988 in Malaysia